The Trade Union Act 1871 (34 & 35 Vict c 31) was an Act of the Parliament of the United Kingdom which legalised trade unions for the first time in the United Kingdom. This was one of the founding pieces of legislation in UK labour law, though it has today been superseded by the Trade Union and Labour Relations (Consolidation) Act 1992.

Background
The Conservative Prime Minister, the Earl of Derby, set up a Royal Commission on Trade Unions in 1867. One worker representative was on the commission, Frederic Harrison, who prepared union witnesses. Robert Applegarth from the Amalgamated Society of Carpenters and Joiners was a union observer of the proceedings.

The majority report of the Commission was hostile to the idea of decriminalising trade unions.  Frederic Harrison, Thomas Hughes and the Earl of Lichfield produced their own minority report, recommending the following changes in the law:
 Combinations of workers should not be liable for conspiracy unless it would be criminal if committed by a single person.
 The restraint of trade doctrine in common law should not apply to trade associations.
 All existing legislation applying to unions specifically should be repealed.
 All unions should receive full legal protection of their funds.

When William Ewart Gladstone's new government came to power, the Trade Union Congress campaigned for the minority report, made under the leadership of Sir William Erle, to be adopted. It was successful.

In its passage through Parliament, Mr Bruce introduced the First Reading of the Bill, quoting the Minority Report.

Provisions of the Act

Section 2 provided that the purposes of trade unions should not, although possibly deemed to be in restraint of trade, be deemed unlawful to make any member liable for criminal prosecution.
Section 3 said the restraint of trade doctrine should not make any trade union agreements or trusts void or voidable.
Section 4 stated that any trade union agreements were not directly enforceable or subject to claims for damages for breach. This was designed to ensure that courts did not interfere in union affairs.
Section 6 provided a system of voluntary registration, which carried some small advantages.
It also allowed union members to access the financial records of the union (now ss 28-30, Trade Union and Labour Relations (Consolidation) Act 1992)

Amendments and repeal
However the Criminal Law Amendment Act 1871 was passed at the same time, which made picketing illegal. This was not repealed until the Conspiracy and Protection of Property Act 1875.

The Act was fully repealed by the Trade Union and Labour Relations Act 1974.

See also
 List of Acts of the Parliament of the United Kingdom, 1860–79

Notes

External links
Full text of Trade Union Act 1871 on worldlii.org
Second Reading of the Trade Union Bill in the Commons

United Kingdom labour law
United Kingdom Acts of Parliament 1871
Trade union legislation
History of labour law
British trade unions history
1871 in labor relations